The Ancient Egyptian Swallow hieroglyph is Gardiner sign listed no. G36 for swallow birds. The Sparrow hieroglyph appears similar in size and shape, though it lacks the swallow's forked tail and is used to represent small, or bad items.

The swallow hieroglyph is used in Egyptian hieroglyphs as a phonogram or biliteral for wr-(or ur), and means items that are "great". It might be considered an equivalent to the cuneiform: gal, GAL, also meaning 'great'. The swallow hieroglyph is also an ideogram for the swallow birds.

See also
Gardiner's Sign List#G. Birds

References

Betrò, 1995. Hieroglyphics: The Writings of Ancient Egypt, Betrò, Maria Carmela, c. 1995, 1996-(English), Abbeville Press Publishers, New York, London, Paris (hardcover)
Budge. The Rosetta Stone, E.A.Wallace Budge, (Dover Publications), c 1929, Dover edition(unabridged), 1989. (softcover)
Budge. An Egyptian Hieroglyphic Dictionary, E.A.Wallace Budge, (Dover Publications), c 1978, (c 1920), Dover edition, 1978. (In two volumes, 1314 pages.) (softcover)

Egyptian hieroglyphs: birds
Legendary birds
Hirundinidae